The Kosovo national under-18 basketball team is the national under-18 basketball team of Kosovo and is controlled by the Basketball Federation of Kosovo.

Competitive record

FIBA Europe Under-18 Championship

FIBA Europe Under-18 Championship (Division C)

Team

Current roster
The following is the Kosovo roster were called up for the 2018 FIBA Europe Under-18 Championship Division C.

|}
| style="vertical-align:top;" |
Head coach
 Ibrahim Karabeg
Assistant coach(es)
 Gyltekin Selimi
 Ilmen Bajra

Legend
Age – describes age,on 22 July 2018
|}<noinclude>

References

External links
 

Under-18 basketball
Men's national under-18 basketball teams